The Fury Stakes is a Thoroughbred horse race run annually at Woodbine Racetrack in Toronto, Ontario, Canada. Run in late April, the stakes race is open to three-Year-Old fillies who were foaled in the Province of Ontario. Raced over a distance of seven furlongs on Polytrack synthetic dirt, it currently offers a purse of $123,375.

The Fury Stakes was first run in 1956 at Fort Erie Racetrack in Fort Erie, Ontario as a  furlong sprint race. In 1970, the race was shifted to Woodbine Racetrack. Since inception it has been contested at various distances:
 6.5 furlongs : 1956-1957, 1975
 6 furlongs : 1958-1969, 1970-1972
 7 furlongs : 1973-1974, 1976–present

Winners since 1999

References
 The Fury Stakes at Pedigree Query

Restricted stakes races in Canada
Sprint category horse races for fillies and mares
Recurring sporting events established in 1956
Woodbine Racetrack
1956 establishments in Ontario